Camera Camera may refer to:

 Camera Camera (Renaissance album), 1981
 Camera Camera (Nazia and Zoheb Hassan album), 1992

See also
 Camera, Camera, Camera, a manga series
 Camera (disambiguation)